Robert Newman may refer to:

Entertainment
 Robert Loftin Newman (1827–1912), American painter and stained-glass designer
 Robert Newman (impresario) (1858–1926), manager of the Queen's Hall and founder of the Promenade Concerts
 Robert Newman (actor) (born 1958), American actor, known for his long-running role on Guiding Light
 Robert Newman (comedian) (born 1964), British comedian, also known as Rob Newman
 Robert Newman (agent), Hollywood talent agent

Politics
 Robert Newman (fl. 1397–1413), MP for Cricklade and Malmesbury
 Sir Robert Newman, 1st Baronet (1776–1848), British MP for Exeter, 1812–1826
 Robert Newman, 1st Baron Mamhead (1871–1945), British MP for Exeter, 1918–1931

Sports
 Bob Newman (born 1938), American football player
 Rob Newman (footballer) (born 1963), English football coach
 Robert Newman (bowls) (born 1975), English bowler

Other
 Robert Newman (sexton) (1752–1804), American sexton who placed lanterns for Paul Revere on his 1775 midnight ride
 Robert G. Newman (1937–2018), American physician, scientist, health manager and philanthropist
 Robert S. Newman (born 1943), anthropologist
 Robert D. Newman, American literary scholar and poet
 Robert A. Newman, American pharmacologist
 Robert B. Newman Jr., United States Air Force general
 Robert Newman, acoustical engineer and co-founder of Bolt Beranek and Newman
Robert W. Newmann (born 1944), American painter, sculptor

See also
 Robert Neumann (disambiguation)